Solongo Batsukh is a Mongolian beauty queen, model and make-up artist. As of 2018, she was one of the few openly transgender people in Mongolia. Solongo Batsukh was born Bilguun Batsukh and grew up as a boy in Dundgovi province. She learnt about different gender identities as a student, and whilst working at an LGBT organisation, she realised she was a woman and began hormone therapy.

Batsukh works as a model and make-up artist. She became a celebrity in Mongolia in 2014, after participating in Miss International Queen, a transgender beauty pageant held in Thailand. She later participated in Miss Universe Mongolia 2018. She advocates for transgender rights in television appearances and on social media.

See also
Ángela Ponce
LGBT Centre Mongolia
LGBT rights in Mongolia

References

External links

Mongolian LGBT people
Transgender female models
People from Dundgovi Province
Mongolian models
Make-up artists
Living people
Year of birth missing (living people)